Dave van Ronk presents Peter and the Wolf with Uncle Moose and the Kazoo-O-Phonic Jug Band is a 1990 album by Dave Van Ronk.

Track listing
"Peter and the Wolf" (18:57)
a) Introduction (5:39)
b) Story (13:18)
"Swing on a Star" (Jimmy Van Heusen, Johnny Burke) (2:59)
"I'm Proud To Be a Moose" (Willy Nininger) (3:08)
"Fooling Frog" (traditional) (3:17)
"Mairzy Doats" (Drak, Hoffman, Livingston) (3:02)
"Teddy Bear's Picnic" (Lyrics: Jimmy Kennedy, Music: John W. Bratton) (3:04)
"Green, Green Rocky Road" (Len Chandler) (3:55)

Details

Track 1
Uncle Moose (Dave Van Ronk)- narrator
Billy Novlck - pennywhistle. clarinet, wolf, kazoo. Jaw harp
Jay Ungar - fiddle, mandolin
Luke Faust - Jug, Jaw harp
Mark Greenberg - guitar, mandolin, banjo, washtub bass
Gordon Stone - hot banjo solo

Other tracks
Dave Van Ronk - all vocals, guitar on #1,2,6, kazoo on #5
Billy Novlck - pennywhistle, clarinet, harmony vocal on #/, kazoo on #5
Jay Ungar - fiddle, mandolin
Luke Faust - Jug, harmony vocal on #7
Mark Greenberg - banjo, guitar on #3,4.5,6 with
Jeff Salisbury - washboard on #3, wood blocks on #4 The Kazoo-o-phonfc Chorus on #5;
Emily Bond, Mlchaela Page, Brlgld Houton, Katherlne Manock, Emily Dill, Maribeth Long, Kim Sudol, Cathy Elwert, Leah Greenberg. And Ms. A. Nonny Moose - Interjection on #3 ' from AMERICAN CHILDREN - Alacazam! 1002
All material, except 'MOOSE", recorded and mixed at TKO Studio, Stowe, Vermont and Charles Eller Studio, Burlington, Vermont by Chuck Eller. "MOOSE' recorded and produced by Marc Black and Ed Bialek / Black Market

References
 information taken directly from CD release, UPC 021661100427

1990 albums
Dave Van Ronk albums
Peter and the Wolf